The 1985–86 Akron Zips men's basketball team represented the University of Akron during the 1985–86 NCAA Division I men's basketball season. The Zips, led by second-year head coach Bob Huggins, played their home games at the James A. Rhodes Arena in Akron, Ohio as members of the Ohio Valley Conference. They finished the season 22–8, 10–4 in OVC play to finish in first place. They defeated Austin Peay, Tennessee Tech, and Middle Tennessee State to win the OVC tournament. The Zips received the conference’s automatic bid to the NCAA tournament. As the No. 15 seed in the Midwest Region, they lost in the first round to Michigan.

Roster

Schedule and results

|-
!colspan=9 style=| Non-conference regular season

|-
!colspan=9 style=| OVC regular season

|-
!colspan=12 style=| OVC tournament

|-
!colspan=12 style=| NCAA tournament

References

Akron Zips men's basketball seasons
Akron
Akron Zips men's basketball
Akron Zips men's basketball
Akron